Hunterz is a British Asian urban musician with Indian pop and Bhangra influences but based in England. His grandmother moved from Kenya to the U.K. after her husband died. She had to sing to feed her six children. With an early training in Indian classical music from the Patiala Gharana, HunterZ has spent a life devoted to music. But born and brought up in the U.K., he joined private music schools to learn the guitar and keyboard. Hunterz raps and sings in English, Hindi and Punjabi in his albums.

After co-producing  Slave II Fusion, he made his solo producing debut in 1999 with No Limits. However, he had no part in the singing.

His vocal debut came in 2003 with the bhangra album Most Wanted.

The second album to bear his name was Phat Trax Vol. 1: Blazin, completed in 2004, which had a more urban flavour in comparison to Most Wanted'''s international style. Most songs contrasted Hunterz' Hindi lyrics with rapping in English. The album also featured Hunterz' brothers Ishers and Vee and his cousin Chan. In December 2004, Hunterz also featured on Streets of Bollywood, an album of remixes of Bollywood songs, with his 'Baby Girl Mix' of "Aap Ka Aana" from the 2000 film Kurukshetra.

In 2005 Hunterz co-wrote and sang a single, "Reasons", with the dub/reggae band UB40. Along with UB40 and The Dhol Blasters he performed this song at the Live 8 London concert in Hyde Park. He also produced four further remixes of Bollywood songs for the album Bollywood Breaks Vol. 1: "Haare Haare", "Tu Cheez", "Dulhe Ka Sehra" and "Pehli Baar".

On 16 June 2008, the album Masterpiece'' was released featuring Vee.

Hunterz attended Kingsbrook Middle School in Bedford between 1984 and 1988, and then John Bunyan Upper School from 1988 to 1991. Rabz, Headz and Lee Daley were amongst his early musical associates. Mrs Parron, a teacher of Hunterz when he was 13 years old, saw his great musical potential even then referred to him as Hunterz. Among his numerous successes were the school record for 100 metres and high jump. Hunterz was affectionately known as 'Alveen' by the staff of Kingsbrook Middle School.

Inspired by the advice to "Give it some welly!" by sports mentor Nigel 'Baldy Aldy' Aldis, Hunterz never stopped searching for his deeper spiritual connection with nature and the living world. Along with business associates Barry Lodge and Richard West, Hunterz and brother Ishaaz (then known by his stage name 'Ishpal') developed a model of retailing merchandise procured via unconventional market mechanisms. This was a successful business operation until Alan 'Mr Ormsby' Ormsby decreed selling bags of prawn cocktail crisps in the playground to be against school rules. Despite support from Mrs Parron and Zeena Horseman, Hunterz was forced to exit the commodity retail business and focus his considerable talents in other areas.

Hunterz performed at the University of Sheffield on 8 February 2010, along with Imran Khan, Veronica and Dr Zeus. In the promotion for this performance, he gave an interview on BBC Radio Sheffield, where he officially announced that his new upcoming album in 2010 will be in collaboration with Rishi Rich.

Musical style
Huntertz' music has been described as a mixture of funk, soul, rock, hip hop and R&B.

References

External links
 Hunter and his prey
 Sound Advice

Bhangra (music) musicians
Desi musicians
English male singers
Living people
Year of birth missing (living people)